Kelashi is a village in Dapoli taluka, Ratnagiri district, Maharashtra state in Western India. The 2011 Census of India recorded a total of 3,145 residents in the village.

Kelashi is a small seaside village, famous for its Mahalaxmi Temple (1100 years old temple),  sand hillocks and Yakub baba's dargah.

Gangabai Sathe, born in Kelashi was married to Peshwa Narayanrao Bhat on 18th April 1763. She was born in the family of Keshav Vinayak Sathe. Sathe family served as the priests in the temple of Mahalakshmi for more than a century. Ruins of Gangabai's birth house are still present in  Kelashi.

Mahalaxmi Temple

The original idol of Mahalaxmi is missing. It is widely believed that the idol was removed for safekeeping during a raid by Habshi or Siddi.

Folklore explaining the missing idol says that Mahalaxmi left the temple to go to Kolhapur.

The current temple was built in 1808 during Peshwa regime but the temple complex is far older. There are mentions that Shivaji and Sambhaji used to visit the temple frequently. Even Peshwas's use to visit the temple for offering prayers. Sathe's served as the pujari's of the temple during this time period. Gangabai Sathe, daughter of the priest was married to Peshwa Narayanrao in 1763. 

Sand Dunes

The village is protected from Bharja river by sand dunes said to be formed due to a tsunami in 16th century.

References 

Villages in Ratnagiri district